Novogodišnje venčanje is a Serbian comedy television film which was premiered on 31 December 2002. It was directed by Zdravko Šotra, and a screenplay written by Miodrag Karadžić.

Cast

External links 

2002 television films
2002 films
2000s Serbian-language films
Films set in Belgrade
Films shot in Belgrade
Films directed by Zdravko Šotra